The Air Defence Battalion is the main air defence unit of the Lithuanian Air Force. It was created as part of efforts to strengthen and organise the air defence capabilities of the Lithuanian Air Force (LTAF), in 2000.

History 
The present Air Defence Battalion is considered to be a revival of a similar unit in the air force of independent Republic of Lithuania between the World Wars, active from 1935 to 1940.

In 1998, efforts to develop and strengthen the LTAF defence capabilities began under supervision of Col. Česlovas Braziulis. That same year, Swedish Defence officials offered to donate weaponry, technical documentation and training programmes to for a battalion. At this time, the idea of establishing the battalion started to become a reality.

From 1999 to 2000 a group of LTAF troops took studies in military training institutions units in Sweden, where they received theoretical knowledge and practical experience working with battalion weaponry.

In July 2000, the LTAF established the Air Defence Battalion. Lt. Col. Remigijus Daujotis was appointed as Commander of the Battalion.

In September 2000, the Battalion received the first consignment of combat equipment from Sweden. Another shipment of combat equipment and ammunition arrived at the end of 2000. According to the bilateral agreement with Sweden, Swedish advisers who help Lithuanians adapt to the battalion's equipment presently work in the Air Defence Battalion.

In June 2020 the first Battery of NASAMS (National Advanced Surface to Air Missile System) medium-range air defence systems procured from Norway was delivered to the Battalion. The personnel is planned to be fully trained by 2021 and integration of the systems into the NATO Integrated Air and Missile Defence System (NATINAMDS) will begin along with that.

Tasks 
The Air Defence Battalion's primary missions include:
 Defend state facilities of vital importance against military aviation attacks from the air in low and medium altitude;
 Support land forces in fighting against ground armoured technical equipment and in other events;
 Train military personnel in carrying out combat tasks.
Development of infrastructure is one key missions of the Air Defence Battalion currently in the stage of development.

Air-defence equipment

See also 

 Airspace Surveillance and Control Command (Lithuania)

External links 
Oro gynybos batalionas
Video coverage of combat firing exercise on May 1-4, 2014

References 

Lithuanian Air Force
Battalions of Lithuania
Military units and formations established in 1935
Military units and formations disestablished in 1940
Military units and formations established in 2000